Jennifer Montag (born 11 February 1998) is a German sprinter. She represented her country at the 2021 European Indoor Championships finishing seventh in the final. In 2007 she was part of the team that set the world U20 record in the 4 × 100 metres relay.

International competitions

Personal bests
Outdoor
100 metres – 11.23 (+1.4 m/s, Wetzlar 2020)
200 metres – 23.50 (+1.5 m/s, Rehlingen 2018)
Long jump – 6.42 (+0.9 m/s, Rhede 2020)
Indoor
60 metres – 7.19 (Dortmund 2021)
200 metres – 24.79 (Leverkusen 2018)
Long jump – 6.21 (Leverkusen 2019)

References

1998 births
Living people
German female sprinters
People from Dormagen
Sportspeople from Düsseldorf (region)
LG Bayer Leverkusen athletes